Fellow of the American College of Emergency Physicians, or FACEP, is a post-nominal title used to indicate that an emergency physician's education and training, professional qualifications,  and ethical conduct have passed a rigorous evaluation, and have been found to be consistent with the high standards established and demanded by American College of Emergency Physicians (ACEP). 

To become a Fellow of the American College of Emergency Physicians, a physician must be an active, life, honorary, or international member of ACEP for three consecutive years and primarily practice as an emergency physician, exclusive of training. The physician must also be board certified by the American Board of Emergency Medicine or the American Osteopathic Board of Emergency Medicine, or by the American Board of Pediatrics in pediatric emergency medicine. Each of these professional boards are member boards of the American Board of Medical Specialties.

See also
Fellowship of the College of Emergency Medicine

External links
American College of Emergency Physicians - FACEP
American Board of Emergency Medicine
American Osteopathic Board of Emergency Medicine - certification information
American Board of Pediatrics - pediatric emergency medicine certification information

Emergency medicine education
Professional titles and certifications